The Man Versus the State is a work of political theory by Herbert Spencer.

It was first published in book form in 1884 by Williams and Norgate, London and Edinburgh, from articles previously published in The Contemporary Review. The book consists of four main chapters: The New Toryism, The Coming Slavery, The Sins of Legislators and The Great Political Superstition.
In this book, English libertarian sociologist Herbert Spencer sees a statist corruption appearing within the liberal ideological framework, and warns of what he calls "the coming slavery". He argues that liberalism, which liberated the world from slavery and feudalism, was undergoing a transformation. Its new love for the state would put liberalism behind a movement to create a new despotism that would be worse than the old. Henry Hazlitt commented that this was "One of the most powerful and influential arguments for limited government, laissez faire and individualism ever written."

The New Toryism
In the first chapter of the book, Herbert Spencer starts by saying that those of which who now pass as Liberals, actually act as Tories of a new type, and proceeds by arguing that the so-called liberals, who once fought for liberalization, liberties and limiting the power of the nobility, have now obtained interest in increasing the power of the parliament and the government instead of protecting the rights of the people; the liberals have changed their ways completely and adopted measures of increasing their importance in the lives of men just as the Tories did, by keeping power into their own hands. In his own words:

Spencer argues that these new "Liberals" simply exchange the power of kings for that of parliament.

The Coming Slavery

In his second chapter, Spencer focuses on the poor social class, reporting certain areas in London, and blaming the existence of poverty in these classes, and in a crude manner, its problems to the society as a whole, on the  certain systems of that society in which the hard work of the young are not rewarded and tend to incline to criminality: such as the religious ones, in which, he argues, waste time reporting things which do not relate to the truth.

The Sins of Legislators

The Great Political Superstition

References

External links
 https://mises.org/library/man-versus-state
 https://mises.org/library/spencers-1884-orwells-1984

1884 non-fiction books
Herbert Spencer